Gore Island, or Isla Gore, is an island in the Colorado River Delta within the state of Baja California, Mexico.  It lies between two dis-tributary channels east of the main channel of the Colorado River and Montague Island that flow southeastward into the Gulf of California, southeast of the mainland of Baja California Peninsula.

References

Islands of the Colorado River
Islands of Mexicali Municipality
Islands of the Gulf of California
Lower Colorado River Valley
Islands of Baja California
Nature reserves in Mexico